Self-intersecting polygons, crossed polygons, or self-crossing polygons are polygons some of whose edges cross each other. They contrast with simple polygons, whose edges never cross. 

Some types of self-intersecting polygons are:
the crossed quadrilateral, with four edges
the antiparallelogram, a crossed quadrilateral with alternate edges of equal length
the crossed rectangle, an antiparallelogram whose edges are two opposite sides and the two diagonals of a rectangle, hence having two edges parallel
Star polygons
pentagram, with five edges
heptagram, with seven edges
octagram, with eight edges
enneagram or nonagram, with nine edges
decagram, with ten edges
hendecagram, with eleven edges
dodecagram, with twelve edges

See also
List of regular polytopes and compounds#Stars
Complex polygon

Geometric shapes
Mathematics-related lists